Giovanni Antonio Pandosi or Giovanni Antonio de Pantusa (died 1562) was a Roman Catholic prelate who served as Bishop of Lettere-Gragnano (1547–1562).

Biography
On 8 January 1540, Giovanni Antonio Pandosi was appointed during the papacy of Pope Paul III as Bishop of Lettere-Gragnano.
He served as Bishop of Lettere-Gragnano until his death in 1562 in Trento, Italy.

References

External links and additional sources
 (for Chronology of Bishops) 
 (for Chronology of Bishops)  

16th-century Italian Roman Catholic bishops
Bishops appointed by Pope Paul III
1562 deaths